Singers & Players were a reggae collective made up of vocalists and musicians associated with Adrian Sherwood's On-U Sound Records. They recorded five albums between 1981 and 1988.

Including artists such as Bim Sherman, Prince Far I and Mikey Dread they were regarded as a dub music supergroup. There was never any fixed line up to the group, and many different artists featured on each track and each album.

Discography

Albums
War of Words  (1981)
Revenge of the Underdog  (1982)
Staggering Heights  (1983)
Leaps and Bounds  (1984)
Vacuum Pumping  (1988)
Golden Greats Volume 1  (1989)
Golden Greats Volume 2  (1995)

Details

War of Words

War of Words was the first album by Singers & Players.  It was released in the U.S. on 99 Records in November 1981 and then in the U.K. on On-U Sound Records in August 1982.  It was produced by Adrian Sherwood and engineered by Dennis Bovell, John Walker, Nobby Turner, Richard Manwaring and Steve Smith.

Track listing
Side One

 "Devious Women" (Jarrett Tomlinson)
 "Quante Jubila" (Michael Williams, Antonio Phillips)
 "Sit and Wonder" (Jarrett Tomlinson)
 "Fit To Survive" (Jarrett Tomlinson)

Side Two

 "Reaching The Bad Man" (Adrian Maxwell, Jarrett Tomlinson)
 "World of Dispentation" (Jarrett Tomlinson)
 "91 Vibrations" (Adrian Maxwell, Jarrett Tomlinson)

Staggering Heights
Staggering Heights was the group's third album.  It was released in July 1983 on On-U Sound Records, and was produced by Adrian Sherwood.

Track listing
Side One

 "African Blood" (Roydel Johnson)
 "Bedward The Flying Preacher" (Michael Williams)
 "Snipers in the Streets" (Roydel Johnson)
 "A Matter of Time" (Jarrett Tomlinson)

Side Two

 "School Days" (Mikey Dread)
 "Socca" (Jarrett Tomlinson)
 "Autobiography" (Michael Williams)
 "This Assembly" (Desmond "Fatfingers" Coke)

Band personnel and collaborators

 Bim Sherman - vocals
 Prince Far I - vocals
 Antonio "Crucial Tony" Phillips - bass, guitar, keyboards, vocals
 Jah Woosh - vocals
 Charles "Eskimo Fox" Kelly - backing vocals
 George Oban - bass
 Keith Levene - guitar
 Keith "Lizard" Logan - bass, vocals
 Veral "Mr. Ranking Magoo" Rose - percussion
 Ari "Stepper" Up - keyboards
 Clifton "Bigga" Morrison - keyboards
 Peter "Doctor Pablo" Stroud - keyboards
 Nick Plytas - keyboards
 Lincoln "Style" Scott -  drums
 Mikey Dread - vocals
 "Congo Ashanti" Roy Johnson - vocals, percussion, guitar
 Errol "Flabba" Holt - bass
 Eric "Bingy Bunny" Lamont - guitar
 Bloodvessel - guitar
 Dwight Pinkney - guitar
 Martin "Frederex" Harrison - guitar
 Carlton "Bubblers" Ogilvie - keyboards
 Akabu (Vyris Edghill & Valerie Skeete) - backing vocals

External links
Artist page at unofficial On-U Sound site
interview with Singers and Players drummer, Eskimo Fox 

British reggae musical groups
On-U Sound Records artists
Situation Two artists